Austrochernes is a genus of pseudoscorpions in the subfamily Chernetinae, first described by Max Beier in 1932. The Australian Faunal Directory decisions for synonymy are based on a 2018 paper by Mark Harvey.

Species of this genus are found in all states and territories of  mainland Australia.

Species 
Species of this genus found in Australia are:

Austrochernes australiensis  - Austrochernes cruciatus  - Austrochernes dewae -  - Austrochernes guanophilus  - Austrochernes imitans  - Austrochernes omorgus

References

External links 

Chernetidae
Pseudoscorpion genera